Costus erythrophyllus is a tropical rhizomatous perennial native to Colombia, Ecuador, Peru, and northern Brazil, which was first described in 1929. The most common form in cultivation grows to about 1 meter in height, with waxy leaves that are dark green on top, and deep purple underneath.

References

 Notizbl. Bot. Gart. Berlin-Dahlem 10: 707 1929.
 JSTOR
 GingersRus

erythrophyllus